Orthochromis mazimeroensis is a species of cichlid endemic to Burundi where it is only known from the Mazimero River and the Nganga River.  This species can reach a length of  SL.

References

External links

mazimeroensis
Fish described in 1998
Taxa named by Lothar Seegers
Fauna of Burundi
Fish of Burundi
Fauna of Tanzania
Fish of Tanzania
Taxonomy articles created by Polbot